Noyes House may refer to:

in the United States (by state then city or town)
Noyes Mansion, Napa, California, listed on the NRHP in Napa County, California
William Noyes Farmstead, Ledyard, Connecticut, listed on the NRHP in New London County, Connecticut
Noyes House (New Canaan, Connecticut), listed on the NRHP in Fairfield County
J.A. Noyes House, Cambridge, Massachusetts, listed on the NRHP
James Noyes House, Newbury, Massachusetts, listed on the NRHP
Noyes-Parris House, Wayland, Massachusetts, listed on the NRHP
Jonathon L. and Elizabeth H. Wadsworth Noyes House, Faribault, Minnesota, listed on the NRHP in Rice County, Minnesota 
Noyes Hall, State School for the Deaf, Faribault, Minnesota, listed on the NRHP in Rice County
Charles P. Noyes Cottage, White Bear Lake, Minnesota, listed on the NRHP
Noyes Cottage, Saranac Lake, New York, listed on the NRHP
John Noyes House, Starkey, New York, listed on the NRHP
Larsen-Noyes House Ephraim, Utah, listed on the NRHP in Sanpete County, Utah
Young-Noyes House, Charleston, West Virginia, listed on the NRHP

See also
Jacob Noyes Block, Suncook, New Hampshire, listed on the NRHP in Merrimack County, New Hampshire